Brenda Shanahan (born 1958) is a Canadian politician who was elected to represent the riding of Châteauguay—Lacolle in the House of Commons of Canada in the 2015 Canadian federal election, and was re-elected in 2019 and 2021.  She is a Liberal Party MP.

Electoral record

References

External links

Liberal Party of Canada MPs
Members of the House of Commons of Canada from Quebec
Women members of the House of Commons of Canada
Women in Quebec politics
Canadian bankers
Canadian financial analysts
21st-century Canadian politicians
21st-century Canadian women politicians
1958 births
Living people
People from Châteauguay